The 1917 Oregon Agricultural Aggies football team represented Oregon Agricultural College (now known as Oregon State University) in the Pacific Coast Conference (PCC) during the 1917 college football season. In their second and final season under head coach Joseph Pipal, the Aggies compiled a 4–2–1 record (1–2–1 against PCC opponents), finished in third place in the PCC, and outscored their opponents by a combined total of 83 to 33. The team played its home games at Bell Field in Corvallis, Oregon. Lee Bissett was the team captain.

Schedule

References

Oregon Agricultural
Oregon State Beavers football seasons
Oregon Agricultural Aggies football